Battersea General Hospital, known locally as the "Antiviv" or the "Old Anti," was a hospital in Battersea, London.

History
The hospital was founded in 1896 by Mrs Theodore Russell Monroe, secretary of the Anti-Vivisection Society. The hospital was notable for not allowing animal experiments to take place in its facilities, and for refusing to employ physicians who were involved in or approved of animal research.

Based at 33 Prince of Wales Drive, Battersea Park, it first opened for in-patients in 1903, with 11 beds for adults and 4 for children. It faced opposition from the medical establishment, who regarded the hospital's existence as "a great slur upon the profession." Because of difficulties attracting funding – its stance made it ineligible for grants from the King Edward's Hospital Fund – it lost its anti-vivisection charter in 1935. It joined the new National Health Service (NHS) in 1948, was closed by the NHS in 1972, and its building was demolished in 1974.

See also
Brown Dog affair

Notes

Further reading
Lansbury, Coral. The Old Brown Dog: Women, Workers, and Vivisection in Edwardian England. University of Wisconsin Press, 1985.

Hospital buildings completed in 1903
Buildings and structures in Battersea
1896 establishments in England
Defunct hospitals in London
1972 disestablishments in England
Hospitals established in 1896
Buildings and structures demolished in 1974